Gamasholaspis is a genus of mites in the family Parholaspididae. There are about 15 described species in Gamasholaspis.

Species
These 15 species belong to the genus Gamasholaspis:

 Gamasholaspis anmashanensis Tseng, 1993
 Gamasholaspis babettae Petrova, 1977
 Gamasholaspis blandus Tseng, 1993
 Gamasholaspis browningi (Bregetova & Koroleva)
 Gamasholaspis communis Petrova, 1967
 Gamasholaspis convexus Tseng, 1993
 Gamasholaspis formosus Tseng, 1993
 Gamasholaspis gamasoides (Berlese)
 Gamasholaspis incisus Petrova, 1968
 Gamasholaspis lingulatus Tseng, 1993
 Gamasholaspis malacus Tseng, 1993
 Gamasholaspis nonunguis Tseng, 1993
 Gamasholaspis pygmaeus Ishikawa, 1980
 Gamasholaspis serratus Ishikawa, 1980
 Gamasholaspis variabilis Petrova, 1967

References

Parholaspididae
Articles created by Qbugbot